The Decoy or A Mirror for Skylarks (French: Le miroir aux alouettes) is a 1935 adventure film directed by Roger Le Bon and Hans Steinhoff and starring Edwige Feuillère, Pierre Brasseur and Jessie Vihrog.

It was the French-language remake of the 1934 film Decoy. The film was produced by the German company UFA in partnership with its French subsidiary ACE. The French title is a reference to a classic device used as a decoy.

Cast
 Edwige Feuillère as Délia  
 Pierre Brasseur as Jean Forestier  
 Jessie Vihrog as Jenny  
 Lucien Dayle as H. Forestier  
 Pierre Labry as Le commandant  
 Daniel Mendaille as Le premier officier  
 Bill Bocket as Le deuxième officier  
 Jeanne Fusier-Gir as La passagère  
 Henri Mairet as Le passager  
 Raymond Aimos as Dimitri  
 Max Maxudian as Le Persan 
 Germaine Godefroid 
 Roger Karl as L'armateur Dekalf  
 Edouard Hamel 
 Henri Bosc as Makarian 
 Henry Bonvallet

References

Bibliography
 Rentschler, Eric. The Ministry of Illusion: Nazi Cinema and Its Afterlife. Harvard University Press, 1996.

External links 
 

1935 films
German adventure films
1935 adventure films
1930s French-language films
Films directed by Hans Steinhoff
Films directed by Roger Le Bon
UFA GmbH films
German multilingual films
Seafaring films
German black-and-white films
1935 multilingual films
1935 comedy films
1930s German films